Fort Hill High School is a four-year public high school in Cumberland, Maryland, United States, serving 780 students in grades 9 through 12. Fort Hill  is part of Allegany County Public Schools.

History

Fort Hill High School was one of three local New Deal projects.  Fort Hill High school was a Public Works Administration project.  Nearby Constitution Park and Greeway Avenue Stadium were Works Progress Administration projects

New Deal funding relating to Fort Hill was initiated in November 1934 and September 1935, when the PWA committed federal funds not to exceed $230,000. The project was labeled PWA Docket #7323.   Other sources brought the total amount pledged for the school to $600,000. Bids were submitted to local officials.

On April 5, 1936, it was announced that George Hazelwood, local contractor, had the lowest bid at $557,809. The initial contract did not provide funding for the auditorium, so the superintendent of schools was authorized to investigate the possibilities of requesting an increase in the grant from the PWA. Subcontractors were William M. Clark of New Castle, Pennsylvania, and Sterling Electric Company of Cumberland, Maryland.

A discussion ensued concerning the naming of the new school - suggested names were Queen City High School, Potomac High School, Fort and Hill High School and Fort Hill High School. The Board of Education of Allegany County unanimously decided upon the name Fort Hill High School on August 12, 1936. The "Fort" reference was derived from a Civil War skirmish at Nave's Crossroad often referred to as the Battle of Folck's Mill. The high ground above the mill was fortified by Union troops against Confederate forces.

When Fort Hill opened, it had 1763 students and 88 teachers. Mr. Heisey was the first principal. Subjects included English, Mathematics, French, Latin, History, Home Economics, Physical Education, Industrial Arts, and Journalism. Music was taught to seventh and eighth graders, who were also located here. Assemblies were held every week, with the junior high and senior high alternating weeks.

Margaret Smith, part of the first group of students, suggested "Res, Non Verba" as the school motto. The Latin phrase translates into "Deeds, Not Words" and is still the school motto.

The school has undergone renovations and additions. In 1980 a gymnasium was built adjacent to the original facility. The entire building underwent a major renovation in 1991-92 with the additions of a music wing, greenhouse, and art rooms. Part of the renovation was a courtyard with its multiple features including classrooms, a playground, and patio with picnic tables.

Athletics

Football
The school has fielded a team for 86 seasons (1936-2021), playing 898 total games (700 wins, 181 losses, 17 ties), producing an all-time winning percentage of 79%. 

 Fort Hill has won nine state football championships since the inception of the Maryland Public Secondary Schools Athletic Association state playoffs in 1974: 1975 (3A), 1997 (2A), 2013 (1A), 2014 (1A), 2015 (1A), 2016 (1A), 2018 (1A), 2021 (1A), and 2022 (1A). 
 Fort Hill has a Maryland state record of most undefeated regular seasons at 20: 1948, 1950, 1957, 1958, 1963, 1973, 1975, 1977, 1990, 1994, 1995, 1997, 2000, 2009, 2011, 2013, 2014, 2016, 2018, 2021. 
 Fort Hill has a Maryland state record of most undefeated seasons overall at 13: 1948, 1950, 1957, 1958, 1963, 1973, 1975, 1997, 2013, 2014, 2016, 2018, 2021.

Facilities
The school gymnasium is used for league basketball.

Greenway Avenue Stadium, located at the school, was constructed in the 1930s by the Public Works Administration as part of President Roosevelt's New Deal and was built for the high school as Fort Hill Stadium. The stadium, since renamed as Greenway Avenue stadium and shared with Allegany High School, is considered to be an historic landmark. A $7 million renovation project to update and expand the 70-year-old facility has been completed.

Notable alumni
 Rebeca Arthur, actress
 James Deetz, archeologist
 Mark Manges, quarterback
 Steve Trimble, NFL free safety (Denver Broncos 1981-1983, Chicago Bears 1987)
 Ty Johnson (American football), running back

References

External links

Fort Hill High School Football Site
 Facebook
Fort Hill Scholarship Fund
We Are Fort Hill

High schools in Cumberland, MD-WV-PA
Public high schools in Maryland
Educational institutions established in 1936
Schools in Allegany County, Maryland
1936 establishments in Maryland